The triathlon competitions at the 2024 Summer Olympics in Paris are scheduled to run from 30 July to 5 August at Pont d'Iéna, featuring a total of 110 athletes who will compete in each of the men's and women's events. After a hugely successful Tokyo 2020, the mixed relay competition remains in the triathlon program for the second time at the Olympics.

Format
The Olympic triathlon contains three components; a  swim,  cycle, and a  run. The competitions take the form of a single event between all competitors with no heats.

The new mixed team event features teams of four (two men and two women). Each athlete performs a triathlon of  swim,  cycle, and a  run in a relay format.

Qualification

The qualification period commenced on 27 May 2022 and will conclude on the same day in 2024. 110 athletes (55 for each gender) will vie for the coveted spots with a maximum of three per gender for each NOC. As the host country, France automatically receives four quota places (two per gender) while the highest-ranked eligible NOC will each obtain two men's and two women's spots at the 2022 and 2023 Mixed Relay World Championships.

Six highest-ranked eligible NOCs will be awarded two quota places per gender based on the World Triathlon Mixed Relay Olympic Qualification Rankings of 25 March 2024, with two more from the Mixed Relay Olympic Qualification Event to be held between 15 April to 27 May 2024. The qualification period concludes with the top 26 individuals per gender securing a coveted place, subject to the limit of three per NOC and ignoring the first two from each NOC that qualified through the mixed relays. One additional spot for each continent will be allocated to the highest-ranked male and female triathlete from the NOC not yet qualified for the Games. The final two spots per gender are awarded to the triathletes under the Tripartite Commission and to those eligible in the top 180 of the World Triathlon individual rankings.

Medal summary

Medal table

Events

See also
Triathlon at the 2022 Asian Games
Triathlon at the 2023 Pan American Games

References

 
Triathlon competitions in France
2024
2024 Summer Olympics events